Coleophora trivalvis is a moth of the family Coleophoridae.

The larvae feed on the buds and blossoming out leaves of Atraphaxis badghysi.

References

trivalvis
Moths described in 1989